Quote-to-cash (or QTC or Q2C) is an information technology term for the integration and automated management of end-to-end business processes on the sell side. 

It includes the following aspects of the sales process:
 Product (or Service) Configuration 
 Pricing
 Quote creation for a prospect or customer or channel partner, and its negotiation
 Customer acceptance of the deal
 Product ordering and fulfillment
 Invoicing
 Payment receipt
 Renewals.

See also 
 Enterprise resource planning

References

Supply chain management